Leptuca cumulanta, commonly known as the heaping fiddler crab or the mangrove fiddler crab, is a species of fiddler crab native to tropical and subtropical areas of the western Atlantic.

Taxonomy

Previously a member of the genus Uca, the species was transferred in 2016 to the genus Leptuca when Leptuca was promoted from subgenus to genus level.

Description
Carapace width is approximately 12-13mm in adult males and 8-9mm in adult females. Displaying males exhibit bright blue green carapaces.

Distribution
The crab can be found in Central America (Panama), South America (Venezuela, Guyana, Suriname, and Brazil), and the Caribbean (Curaçao, Jamaica, and Trinidad). In Brazil, the crab can be found along the coast between the states of Para and Rio de Janeiro.

Habitat
The species lives in brackish environments of low to moderate salinity, including mangrove stands and open mudflats. It lives on sandy silt and sandy clay substrate, and prefers substrate with at least some clay incorporated within it.

References

Ocypodoidea
Taxa named by Jocelyn Crane
Crustaceans described in 1943